The 1999–2000 Turkish Cup was the 38th edition of the annual tournament that determined the association football Süper Lig Turkish Cup champion under the auspices of the Turkish Football Federation (TFF). Galatasaray successfully contested Antalyaspor in the final by 5–3 after extra time. The results of the tournament also determined which clubs would be promoted or relegated.

First round

|}

Second round

|}

Third round

|}

Sakaryaspor withdrew from the tournament.

Fourth round

|}

Bracket

Quarter-finals

|}

Semi-finals

Summary table 

|}

Matches

Final

References

External links 
 1999–2000 Turkish Cup, tff.org
 1999–2000 Turkish Cup, rsssf.com

1999–2000
Cup
1999–2000 domestic association football cups